Mala Aravindan (15 January 1939 – 28 January 2015) was an Indian actor. He was best known for his work as a comedian and character artist  in Malayalam films. He has acted in over 500 films.

Early life

He was born in Vadavucode, Ernakulam district of Kerala state as the eldest son of Thanattu Ayyappan and Ponnamma. His father was an Excise department employee and his mother, a school music teacher. Soudamini, late Ramanathan (died in 2004) and Prakashan are his siblings. His father died when he was studying at seventh class. Later when his mother got transferred, his family relocated to Mala in Thrissur district and he started using the place name as a prefix to his name. He had his primary education from St Antony's High School, Mala, where his mother was a music teacher. Seeing his talent in playing Tabla his mother joined him with Cochin Mohammed Ustad, a famous Tabla artist. He joined for Pre University degree in Christ College, Irinjalakuda but dropped out in between to concentrate on his career.

Career

Aravindan started his career as a Tabla artist. He joined stage plays and started playing Tabla as a background artist. Later, he moved into acting and started performing in professional stage plays of Kottayam National Theaters, Nadakashala, Suryasoma Theatres etc. He continued acting in dramas for 12 years. He has won Kerala State Nataka Academy's Best Actor award for his role in Sooryasoma's play Nidhi. He received State Award in 1978 and 6 other state level awards for the stage play Rasna.

Aravindan started his film career with the movie Ente Kunju, but the film was never released. His first movie released was Thalirukal in 1967 in which he acted as a mental patient among many. His first full-fledged role was in the 1968 movie Sindhooram, directed by Balakrishnan, although it is his critically acclaimed performance from the movie Tharavu which gave him the actual mileage. Since then he has acted in over 400 films for 33 years and established his own style which became his trademark. During the initial stages of his career, the Mala-Pappu-Jagathy trio was a guaranteed crowd-puller among Malayalam film audiences. His last film was Noolppaalam which is yet to be released. He was the president of the AMMA, the association of Malayalam film artistes.

Mala was well known for his different acting techniques which included gestures, vocal variations and his unique laughing style. He was a jovial person who could shoot jokes at any situation. In one interview, Mala remembered once a random guy who came to him and asked him to tell some jokes. during the 1980s, Mala was a really busy artist since he was part of most of the movies doing various comedy roles. He also sang the popular song "Neeyarinjo Melemanathu" along with Mohanlal in the 1985 movie Kandu Kandarinju. His memorable characters are from the movies Bhoothakannadi, Sallapam, Thaaravu, Mimics Parade, Kanmadam, Joker, Meesha Madhavan etc. In the late 1990s, when the mimicry trend took over Malayalam Cinema, there were movies like Moonu Kodiyum Munnooru Pavanum and Mimics Super 1000, which featured full-fledged spoof characters imitating Mala Aravindan by various mimicry artists. Mala was a great fan of actor Nagesh and his acting style was greatly influenced by Nagesh.

Personal life 

Aravindan married his wife Geetha on 2 February 1971, after five years of dating. Geetha is a Christian, and was previously named Anna before changing her name. The couple have two children, Kishore (Muthu) and Kala. Kishore is married to Deepthi and they have a son Vedavyasan(Buchchan) and two daughters Varalakshmi, Urvi. Kala is married to Surendran and they have two children Devi and Vishnu.

Death

Mala Aravindan was admitted to Kovai Medical Centre Hospital in Coimbatore on 19 January 2015, following a massive heart attack and was shifted to the ICU on 24 January, where he was diagnosed with diffused block. He was on ventilator support. The actor had earlier undergone an angiogram after being hospitalized. He died on 28 January 2015 at 6:30 AM, just five days short of his 44th wedding anniversary. He was 76. He is survived by his wife, children and grandchildren.

Awards

 2013 : Kerala Film Critics Association Awards - Chalachitra Prathiba Puraskar
 Kerala Sangeeta Nataka Akademi Award for Best Actor - Nidhi (Suryasoma Theatres)

Filmography 

Kaalchilambu (2021) - Posthumously released
Varnyathil Ashanka (2017) - Photograph of Mullani Pappan, reprisal from Meesa Madhavan
Noolpalam (2016) - Posthumously released
Chaminte Company (2015) - Posthumously released
Nellikka (2015) - Posthumously released
Lal Bahadur Shastri (2014)
Masala Republic (2014)
Punyalan Agarbattis (2013) as Ayyappan
Vallatha Pahayan (2013) as
God for Sale (2013) as Velayudan
August Club (2013) as Lazer
Thappana (2012)
Prabhuvinte Makkal (2012)
Priyappetta Nattukare (2011) as Pappan
 Ninnishtam Ennishtam 2 (2011)
Nanthuni (2010)
Yakshiyum Njanum (2010)
9 KK Road (2010)
Cheriya Kallanum Valiya Policum  (2010) as Kunju
Canvas (2010)
Again Kasargod Khader Bhai (2010)
Swantham Bharya Zindabad (2010) as  Sakhav ACS
T. D. Dasan Std. VI B (2009)
Chagathikoottam (2009)
Rahasya Police (2009)
Paribhavam (2009)
Venalmaram (2009) as Sankarankutty
Doctor Patient (2009)
 Ee Pattanathil Bhootham (2009) Judge
Twenty 20 (2008)
Positive (2008)
De Ignottu Nokkiye (2008)
 Mulla (2008)
Shalabam (2008) as Kumaran
Kaalchilambu (2008)
Thavalam (2008)
Mayabazar (2008) as Kumarankutty Ashan
Mizhikal Sakshi (2008) as Kadarukutty Musaliar
Chithreshalabagalude Veedu (2008)
Panthaya Kozhi (2007) as Chakrapani
Athisayan (2007)
Arunam (2006)
Oruvan (2006) as Velu
Achanteponnu Makkal (2006)
Moonnamathoral (2006)
Chanthupottu (2005)
Finger Print (2005)
OK Chacko Cochin Mumbai (2005) as Paramu
Ponmudipuzhayorathu (2005) as Thankappan
Perumazhakkalam (2004)
Rasikan (2004) as Shivankutti's Uncle
Sethurama Iyer CBI (2004)
Chitrakoodam (2004) as Shankaran Thattan
Mullavalliyum Thenmavum (2003)
Pattalam (2003)
Varum Varunnu Vannu (2003)
Kaliyodam (2003)
Kadha (2003)
Chithrathoonukal (2003)
Njan Salperu Ramankutty (2003)
Nandanam (2003)
Valkannadi (2002)
Oomappenninu Uriyadappayyan (2002)
Jagathy Jagadeesh in Town (2002) as Kallan Bhaskaran
Meesha Madhavan (2002) as Mullani Pappan
 Puthooramputhri Unniyarcha (2002) as Paanan
Kattuchembakam (2002)
Aala (2002)
Desam (2002) as Marthandan
Suvarna Mohangal (2002)
Swapnahalliyil Oru Naal (2002)
Swaraga Ganga (2002)
Grandmother (2002)
Ee Bhargaveenilayam (2002)
Puthuram Puthri Unniyarcha (2002)
Andolanam (2001)
Bhadra (2001)
Unnathangalil (2001) as Joseph
Karumadikuttan (2001)
Kabani (2001)
Thenthuli (2001)
Pranayakalathu (2001)
Kakki Nakshithrem (2001) as Sreedharan
Chithrathoonukal (2001)
Ennum Sambavami Yuge Yuge (2001)
Varnnakazhchakal (2000)
Rapid Action Force (2000) as Jail warden
Kochu Kochu Santhoshangal (2000)
Joker (2000)
Madhuranombarakattu (2000)
Mark Antony (2000)
Ival Doupadi (2000)
Aayiram Meni (1999)
Udayapuram Sulthan (1999)
Charlie Chaplin (1999)
Magician Mahendralal from Delhi (1998) as Mammad
Kanmadam (1998)
Panchaloham (1998) as Karutha
Thattakam (1998)
Kulirkattu (1998)
Thirakalkkappuram (1998)
Manthri Maalikayil Manasammatham (1998)
Kalyana Unnikal (1997)
Kaliyoonjal (1997)
Arjunan Pillayum Anchu Makkalum (1997)
Hitler Brothers (1997)
 Junior Mandrake (1997)
Sammanam (1997)
Gajaraja Manthram (1997)
Ekkareyanente Manasam (1997) as Sudhakaran
Bhoothakannadi (1997)
Anjarakalyanam (1997)
Snehadoothu (1997) as Veeramani
Kaduva Thoma (1997) as D'Cruz
Poomarathanalil (1997) as Ambujakshan
Shobanam (1997)
Ikkarayante Manasam (1997)
Kudamattom (1997)
Mimics Action 500 (1996)
Sathyabhaamaykkoru Pranayalekhanam (1996)
Sallapam (1996)
Saamoohyapadom (1996)
Dominic Presentation (1996) as Father Joseph Medayil 
King Solomon (1996)
Harbour (1996)
Excuse Me Ethu Collegila (1996)
Kinnam Katta Kallan (1996) as Constable Mathew Joseph
 Punnaram (1995)
Puthukottyile Puthu Manavalan (1995)
Mazhavilkoodaram (1995)
Kokkarakko (1995)
Special Squad (1995) as Kochaugasthy
Agnidevan (1995)
Oru Abhibhashakante Case Diary (1995)
Vadhu Doctoranu (1994) as Chinnappan
Pingami (1994)
Manathe Kottaram (1994)
Varabhalam (1994)
 Gothram (1994)
Dollar (1994) as Vettukili Damodharan
Kambolam (1994) as Kochappy
Kadal (1994) as Lasar
Varanamalyam (1994) as Mathai
Ponnu Chami (1993)
Saubhaagyam (1993)
Customs Diary (1993) as Skariachan
Aagneyam (1993)
Vakkeel Vasudev (1993)
Adheham Enna Idheham (1993)
Sarovaram (1993)
 Koushalam (1993)
Jackpot (1993)
Venkalam (1993)
Saubagyam (1993)
Uppukandom Brothers (1993)
Kanyakumariyil Oru Kavitha (1993)
 Pravaachakan (1993)
 City Police (1993)
Utsava Melam (1992)
Maanthrika Cheppu (1992)
Kizhakkan Pathrose (1992)
Kallan Kappalil Thanne (1992)....Appunni Mashu
Annu Good Friday (1992)
Ayalathe Adheham (1992)
Ente Ponnu Thampuran (1992)
Ezharaponnana (1992)
Simhadhwani (1992)
 First Bell (1992)
Welcome To Kodaikanal (1992)
Poochakkaru Manikettum (1992)
Oru Swapnam Pole (1992)
 Maanyanmar (1992)
 Neelakurukkan (1992)
Congratulations Miss Anitha Menon (1992)
Kasargod Khader Bhai (1992) as Mammooty
 Mr & Mrs (1992)
Sandesham (1991)
Kizhakkunarum Pakshi (1991)....Nanappan
Mimics Parade (1991) as Mammooty
Ganamela (1991) as Appukuttan
Neelagiri (1991)
Keli (1991)
Maydinam (1991) as Coach Warrier
Agninilavu (1991)
Amina Tailors (1991) as Jabbar
Uncle Bun (1991)
Kalari (1991)
Mahassar (1991) as Shivadasan
Kadinjool Kalyanam (1991)
Mookilla Rajyathu (1991)
 Daivasahayam Lucky Centre (1991)
 Kalamorukkam (1991)
 Georgootty C/O Georgootty (1991)
Ponnaranjanam (1990)
Enquiry (1990)
Maydinam (1990)
Mukham (1990)
Kottayam Kunjachan (1990) as Anthru
Indhanam (1989)
Puthiya Karukkal (1989)
Mahayanam (1989)
Carnival (1989)
Jeevitham Oru Ragam (1989)
Kodugallur Bhagavathi (1989)
Ammavanu Pattiya Amali (1989)
Annakutty Kodambakkam Vilikkunnu (1989) as Maducakkuzhi Achan
Prabhatham Chuvanna Theruvil (1989)
Agnichirakulla Moham (1989) as Govindan
V.I.P.  (1989) as Kuttoos
Pattana Pravesham (1988)
Kandathum Kettathum (1988) as Sadananthan
Moonnam Mura (1988)
Athirthikal (1988)
Sankhanadam (1988)
Janmatharam (1988) as Karunan
Unnikrishnante Adyathe Christmas (1988)
Onninu Purake Mattonnu (1988) as Appu
Loose Loose Arappiri Loose (1988)
Janmandharam (1988)
Ulsavapittennu (1988)
Swargam (1987)
Nirabhedangal (1987) as Krishan
Agnimuhurtham (1987)
Oru Sindoora Pottinte Ormakku (1987)
Ivare Sookshikkuka (1987)
Mangalya Charthu (1987) as Pappan
Kottum Kuravayum (1987)
Athinumappuram (1987)
Kalam Mari Katha Mari (1987) as Koya
Revathikkoru Pavakkutty (1986)
Pappan Priyappetta Pappan (1986)
Oppam Oppathinoppam (1986) as Neelakandan
Kunjattakilikal (1986)
Naale Njagalude Vivaham (1986) as Mathachan
Ennu Nadhante Nimmi (1986)
Nyayavidhi (1986) as Mathunni
Ente Entethumathrem (1986)
Manjamantharangal (1986)
Kshamichu Ennoru Vakku (1986)
Adukkan Entheluppam (1986)
Geetham (1986)
Shyama (1986)
Alorugi Arangorugi (1986)
Moonnu Masagalkku Munbu (1986)
Prathyekam Sradhikkukka (1986) ...Detective Veerabhadran
Atham Chithira Chothi (1986) as Pushkaran
Snehamulla Simham (1986)
Veendum (1986)
Padayani (1986)
Icecream (1986)
Rareeram (1986) as Aravindakshan
Ponnumkudathinu Pottu (1986)
Katturumbinum Kathukuthu (1986) as Johny
Ithramathram (1986) as Augustine
Oru Yugasandhya (1986) as Kuttappan
Akalagalil (1986)
 Love Story (1986)
Ninnishtam Ennishtam (1986)
Upahaaram (1985) as Sundareshan
Vellarikka Pattanam (1985)
Premalekhanam (1985)
Koodum Thedi (1985) as Vasu
Akkare Ninnoru Maran (1985)
Makan Ente Makan (1985)
Oru Nokku Kanan (1985) as Vidyadharan Mashu
Kandu Kandarinju (1985) as Kittan
Maniyara (1985)
Akkachide Kunjuvava (1985)
Oru Kudakeezhil (1985) as Pushpangathan
Scene No 7 (1985)
Black Mail (1985)
 Akalathe Ambili (1985)
Shantham Bheekaram (1985)
Shatru (1985) as Thamarakshan/Kottada Vasu
Thathamme Poocha Poocha (1984)
Koottinilamkili (1984)
Manithali (1984) as Subaid
Vanitha Police (1984)
Poochakkoru Mookkuthi (1984)
Swantham Sarika (1984)
Kaliyil Alpam Karyam (1984)
Kadamattathachan (1984) as Ithappiri
NH 47 (1984)
Pavam Krooran (1984) as Mathulan
Velichamillatha Veethikal (1984)
Ethirppukal (1984)
Theere Pratheekshikkathe (1984) as Karunan
Vepralam (1984)
Sreekrishnaparundu (1984)
Belt Mathai (1983) as Kuttan Pilla
Aana (1983) as Thomas
Pourusham (1983)
Mazhanilavu (1983) as Mathukutty
Ee Yugam (1983)
Rathilayam (1983) as Lonappan
Thavalam (1983) as Vaasu
Maniyara (1983) as Moideenkutty
Kolakomban (1983)
Nizhal Moodiya Nirangal (1983) as  Kuruppu
Coolie (1983)
Pooviriyum Pulari (1982)
Kakka (1982)
Mylanchi (1982) as Moosa
Ethiralikal (1982) as Pareed
Komaram (1982)
Kolakomban (1982)
Ariyappedatha Rahasyam (1981) as Gopi
Aarathi (1981)
Greeshmajwala (1981) as Nair
Swapnaraagam (1981)
Sphodanam (1981) as Vasu Pilla
Vayal (1981) as Naanu Nair
Arayannam (1981) as Antony
Sambavam (1981)
Thadavara (1981) as Karnan
Raktham (1981)
Tharavu (1981) as Thanki
Sphodanam (1981)
Avatharam (1981) as Parasahayam Thankappan
Itha Oru Dhikkari (1981) as Kumar
Thakilu Kottampuram (1981) as Vasu
Dhandha Yudham (1981)
Oru Vilippadakale (1981)
Daliyapookkal (1980)
Kaavalmaadam (1980) as Rappai
Adhikaram (1980) as Appukuttan
Deepam (1980) as Subrahmanyam
Arangum Aniyarayum (1980) as Ananthan
Chakara (1980) as Kochu Pilla
Thaliritta Kinakkal (1980)
Eden Thottam (1980)
Muthuchippikal (1980) as Sadashivan
Aavesham (1979)
Angakkuri (1979)
Agnivyooham (1979)
Kannukal (1979) as Kuruppu
Madhurikkunna Rathri (1978)
Samayamayilla Polum (1978)
Madhuram Thirumadhuram (1976) as vakeel
Sindooram (1976) - Debut film
Olavum Theeravum (1970)
Madhuvidhu (1970)
Velutha Kathreena (1968)
Thokkukal Kadha Parayunnu (1968)
Pathirapattu (1967)(uncredited role)
Thalirukal (1967) (uncredited role)
Ente Kunju (unreleased)

Television
Mouna Nombaram
Vallarpadathamma
Kadamattathu Kathanar

References

External links 
 
 Mala Aravindan at MSI

Indian male film actors
Male actors in Malayalam cinema
Male actors from Thrissur
Male actors from Kochi
20th-century Indian male actors
1939 births
2015 deaths
People from Ernakulam district
21st-century Indian male actors
Indian male stage actors
Male actors in Malayalam theatre
Male actors in Malayalam television